J. T. Williams was the fifth head football coach at Kentucky State University in Frankfort, Kentucky, and he held that position for three seasons, from 1928 until 1930.  His career coaching record at Kentucky State was 9–9–3.

References

Year of birth missing
Year of death missing
Kentucky State Thorobreds football coaches